The Black Warrior affair was an 1854 incident touching trade and sovereignty between Spain and her American possessions and the United States. 

Black Warrior, a ship in the American coastwise trade, touched at Havana, Cuba on February 28, 1854, on her eighteenth voyage to New York City. In technical conformity with law, but contrary to informal agreements, Cuban authorities demanded a cargo manifest. After a refusal, they seized and held the ship and cargo. The ship and cargo were restored to her owners on payment of a $6,000 fine, which was eventually remitted. 

The controversy led to active discussions in the United States Congress and called forth able papers by  Secretary of State William L. Marcy. However, the tactics of Pierre Soulé, American minister to Spain, temporarily threatened war. Linked somewhat with the Ostend Manifesto, the issue remained unresolved until August 1855, when Spain paid an indemnity of $53,000.

References

Dictionary of American History by James Truslow Adams, New York: Charles Scribner's Sons, 1940

History of the foreign relations of the United States
1854 in the United States
1855 in the United States
Spain–United States relations